Lama is a Gur language spoken by the Lamba people in Togo, Benin, and by a few in Ghana.

Phonology

Consonants

Vowels

Tones

Alphabet

References

 

Languages of Benin
Languages of Togo
Gurunsi languages